Maurice Paléologue (13 January 1859 – 23 November 1944) was a French diplomat, historian, and essayist. As the French ambassador to Russia (1914-1917), he supported the Russian mobilization against Germany that led to World War I and likewise played a major role in France's entry into the ensuing conflict.

Biography
Paléologue was born in Paris as the son of Alexandru Paleologu, a Wallachian Romanian revolutionary who had fled to France after attempting to assassinate Prince Gheorghe Bibescu during the 1848 Wallachian revolution. Alexandru was one of three illegitimate children of Elisabeta Văcărescu of the Văcărescu family of boyars. He and his siblings were later adopted by Zoe Văcărescu, Elisabeta's mother, who gave the children her Greek maiden name Paleologu. The name became Paléologue in French language spellings. The family's relation to the Palaiologos Byzantine Imperial family is doubtful, though Alexandru's ancestors claimed it at the end of the 17th century.

Diplomat
After graduating in law, Paléologue obtained a position with the French Foreign Ministry in 1880 and moved on to become Embassy Secretary at Tangiers in the Sultanate of Morocco and then in Beijing (China) and later in Italy. A Minister Plenipotentiary in 1901, he represented France in Bulgaria (1907–1912) and Imperial Russia (1914–1917). He became General Secretary of the Foreign Ministry in the Alexandre Millerand cabinet.

An Austrian diplomat described his personality in 1911: 
about 50 years old, unmarried ... [he is] prominent, vivacious, well educated, but displays a fantastic imagination  and is an author of novels. [He] permits his novelist's imagination to run away with him when he interprets insignificant military or political events, and, for those who do not know him well, he is therefore dangerous as a source of information.

The British ambassador to Moscow in 1914 provided a similar description: 
He is a very cultivated man, a writer of light romances, as well as books of a more serious vein; but ... his vivid imagination is apt to run away with him and disposes him to take a fanciful and exaggerated view of the political questions with which he has to deal.

His most important and controversial role came when he was the French ambassador to Russia in July 1914. He hated Germany and believed that when war broke out, France and Russia had to be close allies against Germany. His approach agreed with French President Raymond Poincaré, who trusted him. He promised unconditional French support to Russia in the unfolding crisis with Germany and Austria.

Historians debate whether he exceeded his instructions and thereby helped hasten the war. There is agreement that he failed to inform Paris of exactly what was happening and the implications of the Russian mobilisation in launching a world war.

At the beginning of 1917, both Paléologue and his British counterpart Sir George Buchanan became convinced that reforms in Russia were necessary, fearing that otherwise a revolution would overthrow the monarchy and Russia would in that case leave the war. In January 1917 he warned Tsar Nicholas II of Russia that a government should be established that should enjoy the confidence of the Duma. However, the Tsar did not respond to Paléologue's warning. Ultimately, Paléologue witnessed the February Revolution of 1917 that brought down the monarchy.
Later that year, Paléologue returned to France and in 1920 was Secretary-General of Foreign Affairs at the time of the Millerand cabinet.

Later life
Paléologue published essays and novels, and wrote contributions for the Revue des deux mondes. He also wrote several works on the history of Russia in the wake of World War I that included an intimate portrait of the last tsaritsa, Alexandra Fyodorovna. He had been present at meetings between her and Grigori Rasputin, among others. He was called on to give his testimony during the Dreyfus Affair and left important notes on the topic.

Paléologue was elected a member of the Académie française in 1928. He died in Paris in 1944 aged 85, a few months after the city's liberation.

See also
 Russian entry into World War I

References

Further reading
 Halfond, Irwin. Maurice Paléologue: The Diplomat, the Writer, the Man, and the Third French Republic (University Press of America, 2007).
 Paléologue, Maurice. An Ambassador's Memoirs (English translation, 1924).
 Renzi, William A. "Who Composed" Sazonov's Thirteen Points"? A Re-Examination of Russia's War Aims of 1914." American Historical Review 88.2 (1983): 347–357.  online; argues that Paléologue was responsible

External links
 Bio at the Académie française
 Two articles by Maurice Paléologue on Talleyrand and Metternich.
 

1859 births
1944 deaths
Burials at Passy Cemetery
Writers from Paris
French biographers
20th-century French historians
19th-century French novelists
20th-century French novelists
Politicians of the French Third Republic
Members of the Académie Française
French people of Romanian descent
Maurice Paleologue
Ambassadors of France to the Russian Empire
19th-century French diplomats
20th-century French diplomats
People associated with the Dreyfus affair
French male essayists
French male novelists
19th-century French male writers
19th-century French essayists
20th-century French essayists
20th-century French male writers
Male biographers